Tissera is a Sinhalese surname derived from the Portuguese Teixeira. It may refer to the following notable people:
Dayasritha Tissera, Sri Lankan politician
Matías Tissera (born 1996), Argentine football forward 
Michael Tissera (born 1939), Sri Lankan cricketer 
Sobers–Tissera Trophy
Protus Tissera (1925–2007), Sri Lankan politician

Sinhalese surnames